EquityBee is an online platform for helping startup employees exercise their stock options and receive pre-IPO shares from privately held companies. It provides education about acquiring earned stock options and funding for acquiring the shares to startup employees. It was co-founded in 2017 by Oren Barzilai, Oded Golan, and Mody Radashkovich, and is based in Palo Alto, California, United States.

History 
EquityBee was co-founded in 2017 by Oren Barzilai, Oded Golan, and Mody Radashkovich. EquityBee helps startup employees receive funding to exercise their stock options before they expire. The platform empowers startup employees with information and capital to participate in the success of the companies they helped build. 

Barzilai and Golan are serial entrepreneurs; Barzilai founded Tapingo in 2012, which was later acquired by GrubHub for $150 million in 2018. EquityBee was initially based in Tel Aviv, Israel. In 2019, it moved headquarters to Palo Alto, California.

EquityBee received pre-seed funding in September 2018, seed funding in February 2020, Series A funding in February 2021, and Series B funding in September 2021, totaling $83.3 million cumulatively. Group 11, Greenfield Partners, Battery Ventures, Altair Capital, Zeev Ventures, ICON Continuity Ventures, and LocalGlobe are among its investors.

Product 
The EquityBee platform helps startup employees exercise their stock options before they expire. The platform is built and managed by an affiliate of EquityBee Inc. By law, employees have a limited period of time to exercise their stock options when they leave a startup. Lack of finances to cover the cost of employee stock ownership plans (ESOPs) and resulting taxes often lead to the expiration of an employee's vested stock options. EquityBee matches startup employees with its network of selected investors. The investors provide capital that covers the cost of purchasing startup stock options, as well as the accompanying taxes, for a share in potential future gains.

EquityBee has facilitated funding of employees from companies such as AirBnB, Palantir Technologies, QuantumScape, and DoorDash. The EquityBee investor network comprises 8,000 funds, high net-worth individuals, and family offices.

References 

2017 establishments
Software companies based in California
2017 establishments in California
2017 establishments in Israel